Common Service Centres (CSC) (Hindi: जन सेवा केंद्र) are physical facilities for delivering Government of India e-Services to rural and remote locations where availability of computers and Internet was negligible or mostly absent. They are multiple-services-single-point model for providing facilities for multiple transactions at a single geographical location.

CSCs are the access points for delivery of essential public utility services, social welfare schemes, healthcare, financial, education and agriculture services, apart from host of B2C services to citizens in rural and remote areas of the country. It is a pan-India network catering to regional, geographic, linguistic and cultural diversity of the country, thus enabling the Government's mandate of a socially, financially and digitally inclusive society.

Objectives
Officially, the objectives of the CSC have been stated as follows:
Access to information : all remote/ rural citizens
Delivery of public services – G2C & B2C
ICT for rural Empowerment of socially disadvantaged people for inclusive growth
Access to quality education / skill upgradation
Access to cost efficient & quality health services
CSC as a change agent - To promote rural entrepreneurship, enable community participation and effect collective action for social improvement

Through a collaborative framework, the objective of CSC is to integrate the twin goals of profit-making and social services, into a sustainable business model for achieving rapid socio-economic change

Functions
The following types of services are expected to be provided at the CSCs:
G2C Communication - All G2C (Government to Consumer) Communication including Health, Education, Agriculture, Human Resource Development, Employment, Fundamental Rights, Disaster Warnings, RTI, etc.
Information dissemination - Interactive kiosks, voice & Local Language Interface, including web browsing
Edutainment - Including multi-functional space for group interaction, entertainment, training and empowerment
eGovernance & eServices - Transactions like Market (eKrishi) Information, Banking, Insurance, Travel, Post, eForms to request government services, etc.
C2G Kiosk - Grievances, complaints, requests and suggestions.
Financial Inclusion - Payment for NREGA, etc.
Healthcare - Telemedicine & remote health camps have also been envisaged as part of the CSC's extended functionalities
Agriculture
Rural BPO

CSC 2.0 Scheme

Based on the assessment of CSC scheme, the Government launched the CSC 2.0 scheme in 2015 to expand the outreach of CSCs to all Gram Panchayats across the country.
Under CSC 2.0 scheme, at least one CSC will be set up in each of the 2.5 lakh GPs across the country by 2019. CSCs functioning under the existing scheme will also be strengthened and integrated with additional 1.5 lakh CSCs across the country.
CSC 2.0 scheme would consolidate service delivery through a universal technology platform, thereby making e-services, particularly G2C services accessible to citizens anywhere in the country. The CSC Grameen eStore App developed under CSC scheme is powered by MiGrocer.

Key Features of CSC 2.3 scheme
A self-sustaining network of 2.5 lakh CSCs in Gram Panchayats
Large bouquet of e-services through a single delivery platform
Standardization of services and capacity building of stakeholders
Localised Help Desk support
Sustainability of VLEs through maximum commission sharing
Encouraging more women as VLEs

Project components
The Project Components of the CSC consist primarily of Content & Services, Technology, Connectivity, Capacity Building and Business Model.

Required CSC Infrastructure:

Room/Building having a place of 100-150 Sq. Ft.
Two PC's with UPS with 5 hours battery back-up or portable generator set. 
PC with licensed Operating System of Windows 7 or above.
Two Printers. (Inkjet+ Laser)
RAM having the minimum storage capacity of 2 GB
Hard Disc Drive of at least 250 GB
Digital Camera/ Web Cam
Wired/ Wireless/V-SAT Connectivity
Biometric/IRIS Authentication Scanner for Banking Services.
CD/DVD Drive
UPS Integration

History
The CSC project, which forms a strategic component of the National eGovernance Plan was approved in September 2006. It is also one of the approved projects under the Integrated Mission Mode Projects of the National eGovernance Plan. "CSC e-Governance Services India Limited" incorporated on 16 July 2009.

The implementation of the CSC would be done in a Public–private partnership (PPP) model whereby the total project cost of ₹5742 crores, over 4 years, would be shared between Government(30% equal to ₹1649 crores) and private finances (70% equal to ₹4093 crores). The split between central and state government would be ₹856 crore and ₹793 crore respectively.
As of 31st Jan 2011, 88,689 CSCs have been rolled out in thirty-one States/UTs. 100% CSCs have been rolled out in 11 (Eleven) States (Chandigarh, Delhi, Goa, Gujarat, Haryana, Jharkhand, Kerala, Manipur, Puducherry, Sikkim & Tripura). More than 80% of the rollout has been completed in 6 States (Assam, Bihar, Madhya Pradesh, Meghalaya, Mizoram, and West Bengal). In West Bengal, a similar scheme named Bangla Sahayata Kendra has been rolled out, inspired by the CSC model with some modifications. In about 6 States (Chhattisgarh, Himachal Pradesh, Maharashtra, Odisha, Tamil Nadu, and Uttarakhand) implementation of CSCs have crossed halfway mark (more than 50%). It is expected that the rollout of 1,00,000 CSCs would be completed by March 2011.

Revenue support to Common Service Centres
It is envisaged that G2Cservices may take longer to be operational, hence the SCA (Service Centre Agencies) are to be provided support in the form of “Guaranteed Provision of Revenue from Governmental Services” over a period of four years, once the CSCs are certified as operational by the SDA (State Designed Agency). The amount of revenue support is proposed to be 33.33% of the normative value which works out to ₹3304 per CSC per month. This support is to be shared by the Union and State Governments in equal ratio. However, the exact amount of support is to be arrived at through a ‘price discovery mechanism’ discovered through bids (not to exceed 50% of the normative value).

See also
 Digital India
 India Portal
 Ministry of Electronics and Information Technology
 Tele-law programme

References

External links

Digital India initiatives